Hans Welker (21 August 1907 – 24 July 1968) was a German footballer.

References

External links
 

1907 births
1968 deaths
Footballers from Munich
German footballers
Germany international footballers
FC Bayern Munich footballers
Association football forwards